Ethel Cox aka Gwendoline Cook (born 1888) was a British suffragette. Another suffragette born 1897 is also recorded here and her name was Gwendoline Cook.

Lives
In 1913, along with Mary Ann Aldham, she was found breaking windows at the house of the Home Secretary. On 11 October 1913, she attempted to throw leaflets promoting women's suffrage into a Royal carriage. Scotland Yard noted "she is said to be capable of committing any damage." As reported in the criminal record office of the New Scotland Yard, on 16 May 1914, she was detained by police for causing damage to public art and public offices. She was also known under the alias of Gwendoline Cook.

In 2021 a hunger medal was shown on Antiques Roadshow on BBC2 as belonging to someone's grandmother who was named "Gwendoline Cook". Her picture and medal were shown. She was said to have been born in 1897 and to have died around 1981. Her grandson said she was single at the time. He had letters written by her to other leading suffragettes where she complained that she had failed to get arrested on another occasion. Her medal, her whistle and her letters were thought to be worth £6-8,000.

References

1888 births
Year of death missing
British suffragists